Ganga Prasad Birla (2 August 1922 – 5 March 2010), born in Benares was an Indian industrialist. Ganga Prasad Birla belonged to Maheshwari Marwari Community from Rajasthan.

Early life 
He was the grandson of Baldeo Das Birla, the son of Brij Mohan Birla and the father of CK Birla. In 1940, he became the first graduate in the Birla family.

Career 
He joined the board of 

in 1942 and later became its chairman in 1957. He began his innings in group flagship, Hindustan Motors in 1969 and became its chairman in 1982. He also founded Hyderabad Industries Limited and many academic institutions such as Birla Institute of Technology, Birla Archaeological and Cultural Research Institute, Modern High School for Girls, Kolkata, and hospitals such as BM Birla Heart Research Institute and Calcutta Medical Research Institute. He built temples in Hyderabad, Jaipur and Bhopal, and supported the renovation of places of historical, architectural and religious importance. He gradually pulled out of active business life after his second heart attack in 1981. He still came to office for as long as he could, but responsibilities had long been farmed out to his son CK Birla.

Birla was awarded the Padma Bhushan in 2006 for his contributions to the society and the field of education.

See also
 CK Birla Group
 NBC Bearings
 Orient Electric

References

Indian industrialists
Indian billionaires
Rajasthani people
1922 births
2010 deaths
Ganga Prasad
CK Birla Group
Recipients of the Padma Bhushan in social work
Businesspeople from Varanasi
20th-century Indian businesspeople